Šibenik is a mountain in inland Dalmatia, Croatia. Its highest peak is Veliki Šibenik at 1,314 m.a.s.l.

References

Mountains of Croatia
Landforms of Šibenik-Knin County